The Beyond is the second studio album by Swedish post-metal band Cult of Luna, released in 2003. The subject matter is dissent with authorities, similar in some ways to contemporaries Isis' Panopticon. This album sees the rawness of the self-titled debut channeled into a cleaner sounding and more crisply produced sound. The tempo is slowed and the feeling is of a more expansive, reflective album, which almost bridges the gap between Cult of Luna and Salvation, leaning more towards the former (elements of which can be heard in "Arrival", "Leash" and "Deliverance", whilst "Circle" has the most similarity to the latter).

Track listing 
All tracks written by Cult of Luna.

Personnel

Band members 
 Marco Hildèn – drums and percussion
 Andreas Johansson – bass
 Magnus Lindberg – percussion, guitar, recording, mixing and production
 Erik Olofsson – guitar
 Johannes Persson – guitar and vocals
 Klas Rydberg – vocals

Additional personnel 
 Per Gustafsson – artwork and graphic design
 Johanna Hedlund – cello
 Thomas Hedlund – additional percussion
 Pelle Henricsson – production, mastering and mixing
 Ola Klüft – additional vocals
 Anders Pettersson - pedal steel guitar
 Jonas Rosen – additional vocals

References 

Cult of Luna albums
2003 albums
Earache Records albums